George Cochrane Hazelton (January 3, 1832September 4, 1922) was an American attorney and politician. He represented Wisconsin in the United States House of Representatives for the 45th, 46th, and 47th U.S. congresses, and was the first appointed attorney general of the District of Columbia.

Early life and education
Born in Chester, New Hampshire, Hazelton attended the district schools and prepared for college at Pinkerton Academy in New Hampshire and Dummer Academy in Massachusetts. Hazelton graduated from Union College in Schenectady, New York, in 1858. He studied law and was admitted to the bar in Malone, New York.

Career
Hazelton then settled at Boscobel, Wisconsin, where he became prosecuting attorney of Grant County, Wisconsin, from 1864 to 1868. He was elected to the Wisconsin State Senate in 1867 and was reelected in 1869 and served as president pro tempore.

Elected as a Republican to the United States House of Representatives in the Forty-fifth, Forty-sixth, and Forty-seventh congresses, representing Wisconsin's 3rd congressional district. He was unsuccessful candidate for renomination in 1882 and settled in Washington, D.C., where he practiced law and served as the attorney general for the District of Columbia during the Harrison administration.

Hazelton was among a large group of congressmen who advocated doctrines of racial superiority. He argued against the immigration of "unworthy" races, and said of the Chinese "I know that if the segment of her population now upon the Pacific shores is the standard and measure of her home civilization, it is of the lowest order.”

Personal life

Hazelton was son of William and Mercy Jane Hazelton. His older brother, Gerry Whiting Hazelton, was also a member of Congress, and a prominent lawyer in Wisconsin. His nephew, Clark Betton Cochrane, was a member of Congress from New York.

He married Ellen Van Antwerp and they had two sons, George Jr. and John Hampden.

Death
Hazelton died in Chester, New Hampshire, on September 4, 1922, at the age of 90. He is interred at Vale Cemetery, Schenectady, New York.

References

External links
 
 

|-

1832 births
1922 deaths
Wisconsin state senators
People from Chester, New Hampshire
Pinkerton Academy alumni
Washington, D.C., Republicans
Republican Party members of the United States House of Representatives from Wisconsin
The Governor's Academy alumni